The Katayama Detachment  was a task force of the 2nd Division of the Imperial Japanese Army during the Soviet–Japanese border conflicts of 1939.  The detachment fought small actions near Akiyama heights, or Heights 997 during 6–10 September 1939. The 2nd Division, along with the 4th Division, was attached to Sixth Army during the Battle of Khalkhin Gol as reinforcements for a projected counterattack that was canceled when a ceasefire was signed.

Component units
Katayama Detachment:
 15th Infantry Brigade 
 16th Infantry Regiment
 30th Infantry Regiment
 1 Field Artillery battalion

Sources 
 Coox, Alvin D. Nomonhan, Japan Against Siberia, 1939. Stanford, CA: Stanford University Press, 1985.

Detachment, Katayama